Saint-Ost is a commune in the Gers department in southwestern France.

Geography
The Petite Baïse forms part of the commune's southeastern border, flows north through the middle of the commune, then forms part of the commune's northeastern border.

Population

See also
Communes of the Gers department

References

Communes of Gers